Petri Salo (born March 26, 1964 in Vaasa, Finland) is Finnish educational researcher, and public figure in adult education. He is a professor in adult education at the Åbo Akademi University, Vaasa (Finland). Previously he has worked as Assistant Professor and Professor of adult education besides his institution also at University of Tampere. From the beginning of 2007, he is the chief editor for the Finnish scientific journal Aikuiskasvatus (Adult education).

Petri Salo has visited as a guest lecturer in various universities in Finland (University of Helsinki, University of Joensuu), Scandinavia (University of Gothenburg (Gothenburg), Sweden, Norwegian University of Science and Technology Trondheim, and University of Tromsø, Tromsø, Norway), Estonia (University of Tarto), the U.S. (University of Minnesota), and Australia (Charles Sturt University, Wagga Wagga)

His studies have concentrated on the tradition and trends in Finnish and Nordic popular adult education, especially Swedish-speaking Finns' cultural and educational activities. In addition to adult education he has published in the fields of teacher education, action research, and organizational sociology.

Major works
In English

 Education - Liberty, Fraternity, Equality? Nordic views on lifelong learning (co-edited with Risto Rinne & Anja Heikkinen), 2006
 Nurturing Praxis - Action Research in Partnerships Between School and University in a Nordic Light (co-edited with Karin Rönnerman & Eli Furu), 2008
 Decision-making as a Struggle and Play - On alternative rationalities in schools as organisations. Educational Management, Administration and Leadership, 36 (4), 495–510, 2008
 Action Research and the Micropolitics in Schools. Educational Action Researcher, 16 (3), 295–308. (with Tor Vidar Eilertsen and Niklas Gustafson), 2008

In Finnish

Sivistyksellinen aikuiskasvatus (with Juha Suoranta), 2002
Edistävä ja viihdyttävä aikuiskasvatus (Co-edited with Jukka Tuomisto), 2006
 Aikuiskasvatukse risteysasemalla. Johdatus aikuiskasvatukseen (with Juha Suoranta, Juha Kauppila, Hilkka Rekola & Marja Vanhalakka-Ruoho), 2008

In Swedish

Skolan som mikropolitiska organisation (diss.), 2002
Vilken utgång - folkbilding?, 2004
Skolans sociala arkitektur, 2007

External links
Petri Salo's webpage http://www.vasa.abo.fi/users/psalo/Web/nyhem.htm

1964 births
Living people
People from Vaasa
Finnish educational theorists
Academic staff of Åbo Akademi University